15th OTO Awards

SND, Bratislava, Slovakia

Overall winner  Adela Banášová

Hall of Fame Marika Gombitová

Život Award Pavel Dvořák

◄ 14th | 16th ►

The 15th OTO Awards honoring the best in Slovak popular culture for the year 2014, took time and place on March 14, 2015 at the former Opera building of the Slovak National Theater in Bratislava. The ceremony broadcast live the channel Jednotka of RTVS, while the hosts of the show were Adela Banášová and Matej "Sajfa" Cifra, both for the third time in a row.

Nominees

Main categories
 Television

 Music

Others

Reception

TV ratings
The show has received a total audience of more than 601,000 viewers, making it the most watched television program within prime time in the region.

References

External links
 OTO 2014 – 15th edition  (Official website)
 Winners (at Život.sk)

OTO Awards
2014 in Slovak music
2014 in Slovak television
2014 television awards